Sharsha Union is a Union Parishad under Sharsha Upazila of Jessore District in the division of Khulna, Bangladesh.

References

Unions of Sharsha Upazila
Unions of Jessore District
Unions of Khulna Division